Vallenfyre was a British death metal band founded in Halifax, West Yorkshire, England, as a side project by Paradise Lost's chief songwriter and lead guitarist Gregor Mackintosh in 2010 as tribute to his father's death in December 2009.

Vallenfyre took part in the Decibel Magazine Tour 2015, alongside At the Gates, Converge, and Pallbearer.

Members

Final lineup
Gregor Mackintosh – vocals (2010–2018)
Hamish Glencross – lead guitar (2010–2018)
Waltteri Väyrynen – drums (2014–2018)

Live musicians
Sam Kelly-Wallace – bass guitar (2013), rhythm guitar (2014–2018)
Chris Casket – bass guitar (2016–2018)

Past members
Mully – rhythm guitar (2010–2013)
Adrian Erlandsson – drums (2010–2014)
Scoot – bass guitar (2010–2013, 2013–2015, 2015–2016)
Alejandro Corredor – bass guitar (2015)

Discography

Albums

EPs

Music videos

References

Musical groups established in 2010
Musical groups disestablished in 2017
English death metal musical groups
Musical groups from West Yorkshire
Century Media Records artists
2010 establishments in England